Rychely Cantanhede de Oliveira (born 6 August 1987), known as just Rychely, is a Brazilian footballer who plays for Operário-MS.

Biography
Born in Santa Luzia, Maranhão, Rychely started his career with Nacional Atlético Clube Sociedade Civil Ltda. of Paraná state. In mid-2005 he was signed by Japanese side FC Tokyo. Rychely made his senior debut in the next season, and in January 2008 loaned to Montedio Yamagata of J. League Division 2.

Rychely returned to Brazilian January 2009 and went to Hungary in September. In January 2010 he returned to Brazil again and was signed by teams from São Paulo state.

On 2 May 2011, Rychely signed a one-year contract with Brazilian giant Santos FC.

Club statistics

References

External links
 CBF 
 Futpedia 
 

Brazilian footballers
FC Tokyo players
Montedio Yamagata players
Esporte Clube Bahia players
Győri ETO FC players
América Futebol Clube (SP) players
Esporte Clube Santo André players
Santos FC players
Esporte Clube Vitória players
Paulista Futebol Clube players
Goiás Esporte Clube players
Ceará Sporting Club players
Associação Chapecoense de Futebol players
Red Bull Brasil players
Mirassol Futebol Clube players
Associação Atlética Aparecidense players
Esporte Clube Taubaté players
Anápolis Futebol Clube players
Clube Atlético Patrocinense players
Operário Futebol Clube (MS) players
Campeonato Brasileiro Série A players
Campeonato Brasileiro Série B players
Campeonato Brasileiro Série D players
J1 League players
J2 League players
Brazilian expatriate footballers
Expatriate footballers in Japan
Expatriate footballers in Hungary
Brazilian expatriate sportspeople in Japan
Brazilian expatriate sportspeople in Hungary
Association football forwards
Sportspeople from Maranhão
1987 births
Living people